Michael Banim (5 August 1796 – 30 August 1874) was an Irish short story writer. Brother of John Banim, he was born in Kilkenny, and died in Booterstown.

Personal life
Michael was educated at Dr Magrath's Catholic school. He went on to study for the bar, but a decline in his father's business caused him to retire from his studies. He returned home to take over the family business, which he returned to prosperity, restoring his parents to comfort, both material and mental. In 1826 he visited John in London, making the acquaintance of many distinguished men of letters. When the struggle for catholic emancipation was at its height, Michael worked energetically for the cause. In 1828 he had the honor of a visit from the Comte de Montalembert, who had read the ‘O'Hara Tales’ and was then on a tour through Ireland.

When John Banim was struck down by illness, his brother wrote and earnestly invited him to return to Kilkenny and share his home. "You speak a great deal too much," he observed in one letter, "about what you think you owe me. As you are my brother, never allude to it again. My creed on this subject is, that one brother should not want while the other can supply him." However, John remained in France, seeking medical care in Paris.

In 1840, Michael married Catherine O'Dwyer with whom had two daughters, Mathilde and Mary. Although a man of means, in less than a year he lost almost the whole of his fortune through the failure of a merchant. Poor health followed. He was appointed postmaster of Kilkenny in 1852 which he held until illness forced him to retire in 1873. He also served a term as mayor. His health failing, he went with his family to reside at Booterstown, near Dublin, where he died in 1874. His widow was granted a civil list pension.

Works
Around 1822 John Banim broached to Michael his idea for a series of national tales. 
Michael assisted John in the O'Hara Tales, where he used the name "Abel O'Hara," and there is difficulty in allocating their respective contributions. While John was the more experienced writer, Michael provided material based on his social observations. They revised each other's work; according to Patrick Joseph Murray's Life of John Banim. Michael wrote in such hours as he could snatch from business, and was the principal author of about thirteen out of the twenty-four works attributed to the brothers including Crohoore of the Bill-Hook, The Croppy, and Father Connell.  Michael Banim was amiable, unambitious, modest, and generous to a degree. He kept himself in the background, letting his younger brother have all the honor of their joint production. After the death of John, Michael wrote Clough Fionn (1852), and The Town of the Cascades (1864). In 1861 he wrote prefaces and notes for a reprint of the "O'Hara" novels by the publishing firm Sadlier of New York.

Besides their desire to give a true picture of their country, still crippled and prostrate from the effects of the Penal Laws, the Banims were undoubtedly influenced by the Romantic movement, then at its height.

See also
John and Michael Banim bibliography

References

Sources
Author and Bookinfo.com

External links
 

1796 births
1874 deaths
People from County Kilkenny
Irish male short story writers
Irish male poets
Irish male novelists
19th-century Irish poets
19th-century Irish novelists
19th-century Irish short story writers
19th-century Irish male writers
Mayors of Kilkenny
19th-century pseudonymous writers